Nathan Gregory Smith (born 15 July 1998) is a New Zealand cricketer. He made his first-class debut for Otago on 30 March 2016 in the 2015–16 Plunket Shield. Prior to his first-class debut, Smith was named in New Zealand's squad for the 2016 Under-19 Cricket World Cup. He made his Twenty20 (T20) debut for Otago on 26 December 2016 in the 2016–17 Super Smash. He made his List A debut for Otago on 25 January 2017 in the 2016–17 Ford Trophy.

In June 2018, he was awarded a contract with Otago for the 2018–19 season. In December 2019 he took 5 for 14 off 3.4 overs in Otago's T20 victory over Northern Districts. In June 2020, he was offered a contract by Otago ahead of the 2020–21 domestic cricket season. In November 2020, Smith was named in the New Zealand A cricket team for practice matches against the touring West Indies team.

Smith has played Hawke Cup cricket for North Otago since 2014. In February 2021 he took six wickets when North Otago defeated Nelson by an innings to win the title.

References

External links
 

1998 births
Living people
New Zealand cricketers
Otago cricketers
Cricketers from Dunedin